Visitor (band) is a UK-based electronic music group, formed in London in late 2009. Its two founding members, Kyle Gibson and Lucas Gianello, were born in Australia and met at high school, where they formed their first band, one of many leading up to the creation of Visitor. Visitor's debut single, "Los Feeling", was released by Vulture Music in 2010 headed up by Alan Braxe. The duo have maintained a working relationship with the producer Diamond Cut, who having remixed an earlier song created by the duo, effectively serves as a silent member of the group.

Sound 
Visitor's sound can be described as 1980s-influenced, with descriptions from journalists such Pop Justice as sounding like the missing link between The Killers and The Pet Shop Boys. They are also, in part due to their peers and those they work with, recognised as having a French touch sound

Discography

Singles 
"Los Feeling” - 2010
”Love” - 2010
”Coming Home” - 2012
”RNB” - 2012

Remixes 
Amy Meredith "Young at Heart"
Lifelike "Love Emulator"
Dirty Vegas "Little White Doves"

References

External links 
Visitor.fm
Visitor Soundcloud Page
Vulture Records Los Feeling Release

Musical groups from London
English electronic music groups